Opera House–Starnes Jewelers Building, also known as Starnes Jewelers and Opera House, is a historic commercial building located at Albemarle, Stanly County, North Carolina. It was built in 1907–1908, and is a 2 1/2-story, Colonial Revival style brick building. It has a parapet-front standing-seam metal roof.  About 1939, the first floor storefronts were remodeled and fitted with black Carrara glass panel facades and plate glass and chromium display windows and entrances in the Art Moderne style.  The building's front was restored in 1990.

It was added to the National Register of Historic Places in 1995. It is located in the Downtown Albemarle Historic District.

References

Commercial buildings on the National Register of Historic Places in North Carolina
Colonial Revival architecture in North Carolina
Streamline Moderne architecture in the United States
Commercial buildings completed in 1908
Buildings and structures in Stanly County, North Carolina
National Register of Historic Places in Stanly County, North Carolina
Historic district contributing properties in North Carolina
1908 establishments in North Carolina